The Provincial Assembly of Kongo Central is the provincial legislature of Kongo Central, Democratic Republic of the Congo.

François Kimasi Matuiku Basaula is the speaker of the assembly with Kisombe Kiaku Muisi being the vice-speaker.

Provincial legislatures of the Democratic Republic of the Congo
Kongo Central